The 2011 season of the Bhutanese A-Division was the seventeenth recorded season of top-flight football in Bhutan. The league was won by Yeedzin, their third title and second in a row. The league was played as a single round-robin series of matches in anticipation of the commencement of a full National League; however, this was delayed by a season.

League table

References

Bhutan A-Division seasons
Bhutan
Bhutan
1